Thandani "Bibo" Ntshumayelo (born 20 April 1990 in Heilbron, Free State) is a South African football midfielder who plays for Swallows FC

Club career
A product of SuperSport United's youth academy, Ntshumayelo was promoted to the first team in 2009 and made 20 league starts in his maiden season in top-flight soccer. In January 2012, Ntshumayelo joined league champions Orlando Pirates. In January 2016, he received a four-year ban from football by the South African Institute for Drug Free Sport after he tested positive for a banned substance following abuse of cocaine.

International career
He made his international debut for South Africa versus Tanzania on 14 May 2011.

References

External links
 
 

1990 births
Living people
People from Heilbron
South African soccer players
SuperSport United F.C. players
Orlando Pirates F.C. players
Baroka F.C. players
Association football midfielders
South Africa international soccer players
2011 CAF U-23 Championship players